Georgi Milanov (8 September 1952 – 2 November 2014) was a Bulgarian ice hockey player and coach who played for Slavia Sofia and the national team. He also coached the national team on multiple occasions. In helped Slavia Sofia win the Bulgarian championship in the 1984–85 season, winning the best goaltender award in the process. He began coaching in 1987, leading Slavia to another title in his first season. This started a period of Slavia winning 17 championships over the next 25 years, with Milanov as coach. He had a son, Martin, who also played hockey and would coach the Bulgarian junior teams.

References

External links
 

1952 births
2014 deaths
Bulgarian ice hockey goaltenders
HC Slavia Sofia players
Sportspeople from Sofia